Mrs. Julian Heath (Jennie Dewey Heath,) (1863 - November 18, 1932) founded the National Housewives League in 1911, and served as its president until her death in 1932.

In 1924 she began regularly appearing on the WJZ radio station in New York, talking about home economics. She was on-air five days a week for several years. Before starting the radio show, the Housewives League had its share of scandals due to conflicts of interest arising from endorsements of food manufacturers who also advertised heavily in the league's publications.

Earlier in life, Heath also did some work with Jacob Riis at the Flower Mission and Riis Settlement House.

Heath was born in Stonington, Connecticut, and died at her home in Douglaston, Queens in 1932, survived by her son Julian D. Heath, and was buried at Kensico Cemetery.

References

External links
 Photos of Mrs. Julian Health at the Library of Congress

  

1863 births
1932 deaths
Radio personalities from New York City
People from Stonington, Connecticut
Home economists
People from Douglaston–Little Neck, Queens
Burials at Kensico Cemetery